Calliostoma metabolicum is a species of sea snail, a marine gastropod mollusk in the family Calliostomatidae.

Some authors place this taxon in the subgenus Calliostoma (Fautor)

Description
The height of the shell attains 10 mm.

Distribution
This species occurs in the Pacific Ocean off Vanuatu.

References

 Vilvens C. 2005. New records and new species of Calliostoma and Bathyfautor (Gastropoda: Calliostomatidae) from the Vanuatu, Fiji and Tonga. Novapex 6(1–2): 1–17
 Bouchet, P.; Fontaine, B. (2009). List of new marine species described between 2002–2006. Census of Marine Life

External links
 

metabolicum
Gastropods described in 2005